In automobile design, a rear-engine design layout places the engine at the rear of the vehicle. The center of gravity of the engine itself is behind the rear axle. This is not to be confused with the center of gravity of the whole vehicle, as an imbalance of such proportions would make it impossible to keep the front wheels on the ground.

Rear-engined vehicles almost always have a rear-wheel drive car layout, but some are four wheel drive. This layout has the following features:
Packaging: since there is no need for a transmission tunnel, the floor can be flat.
Rear traction: having the engine located over the driven wheels increases downward pressure, which is helpful for grip on loose surfaces, although can be prone to oversteer.
Simplicity of manufacture: the engine is near the driven wheels, and the transmission can be merged with the differential to save space.

This layout was once popular in small, inexpensive cars and light commercial vehicles. Today most car makers have abandoned the layout although it does continue in some expensive cars, like the Porsche 911. It is also used in some racing car applications, low-floor buses, some Type-D school buses, and microcars such as the Smart Fortwo. Some electric cars feature both rear and front motors, to drive all four wheels.

Notable rear-engined cars

Benz Patent-Motorwagen
BMW 600, 700, and i3
Chevrolet Corvair
Davrian
DMC DeLorean
Dune buggies such as the Meyers Manx
Fiat 500, 600, 850, 126 and 133
FMR Tg500
Hillman Imp
Hino Contessa
Mercedes-Benz 130/150/170H
Mitsubishi i and Mitsubishi i-MiEV
NSU Prinz
Porsche 356, 911 generations, and 959
Puma (car manufacturer)
Renault 4CV, Dauphine, Floride, Caravelle, R8, R10 and the 3rd generation Twingo
Renault Alpine A106, A108, A110, A310 and GTA/A610
SEAT 600, 850 and 133
Simca 1000
Škoda 1000/1100MB,MBX, 100/110, 110R, 105/120/125, 130/135/136, Garde, Rapid
Smart Fortwo, Roadster and 2nd generation Smart Forfour
Stout Scarab
Subaru 360, Subaru R-2, 1st generation Subaru Rex
Suzuki Fronte 360, Fronte 71 and 72, Fronte Coupé, Fronte LC20, Fronte 7-S / SS10 / SS20 and Cervo SS20 / SC100
Tata Nano, Tata Pixel and Tata Magic Iris
Tatra 77, 87, 97, 600, 603, 613, 700
Tesla Roadster, some versions of the Model S, and Model 3 
Tucker 48 'Torpedo'
Volkswagen Type 62 and Type 82 Kubelwagen, the Kommandeurswagen and Schwimmwagen
Volkswagen Beetle, type 3 'pontoon', Karmann Ghia and type 4 (411/412), as well as the VW Microbus / Transporter and type 181 'Thing'
ZAZ Zaporozhets series.

See also 
 Mid-engine design
 Rear-engine, front-wheel-drive layout
 Rear-engine, rear-wheel-drive layout

References

 
Car layouts
de:Heckantrieb
id:Mesin belakang
ja:リアエンジン
pt:Motor traseiro